The Crimes Act 1961 is an act of New Zealand Parliament that forms a leading part of the criminal law in New Zealand. It repeals the Crimes Act 1908, itself a successor of the Criminal Code Act 1893. Most crimes in New Zealand are created by the Crimes Act, but some are created elsewhere. All common law offences are abolished by section 9, as are all offences against acts of the British Parliaments, but section 20 saves the old common law defences where they are not specifically altered.

The Crimes Act is administered by the Ministry of Justice. The act has 14 parts dealing with various issues including jurisdiction, punishments, "matters of justification and excuse", crimes against the public order, crimes affecting the administration of law and justice, "crimes against morality and decency, sexual crimes, and crimes against public welfare", "crimes against the person", property crimes, and "threatening, conspiring and attempting to commit and offense." Over the years, the legislation has been amended by several new acts, including the Homosexual Law Reform Act 1986, the Prostitution Reform Act 2003, the Crimes (Substituted Section 59) Amendment Act 2007 ("anti-smacking law"), the Crimes Amendment Act (No 2) 2008, and the Abortion Legislation Act 2020.

Key provisions

Punishments (Part 2)
Section 13 of the Crimes Act states that the powers of the courts under other acts will not be affected by the Crimes Act. The sections relating to the death penalty and putting under bond have been repealed.

Section 17 bans solitary confinement as a form of punishment. Section 19 empowers the High Courts to impose fines.

Matters of justification or excuse (Part 3)
Includes infancy, insanity, compulsion, ignorance of law, sentence or process, arrest, use of force, breach of the peace, defence against assault, defence of property, peaceable entry, powers of discipline, surgical procedures, and other general provisions.

Sections 21 and 22 establish the defence of infancy. Children aged under 10 years old are assumed incapable of committing a crime and cannot be charged with any crime. Children aged between 10 and 14 years inclusive have the rebuttable presumption of incapacity to commit a crime; they cannot be charged unless the prosecution can prove the child knew what they were doing was a criminal offence.

Sections 50, 169 and 170 dealt with the provocation defence which mitigated fatal assaults to the lesser charge and penalty due to manslaughter, rather than murder. Section 50, which define provocation, was repealed by section 2(1) of the Crimes Amendment Act 1980. Sections 169 and 170 was repealed in December 2009 through bipartisan consent with the exception of the ACT New Zealand party.

Crimes against public order (Part 5)
Includes treason and other crimes against the King and the State; offence of oath to commit offence; unlawful assemblies, riots, and breaches of the peace; piracy; slave dealing; participation in criminal gang; and smuggling and trafficking in people.

Crimes affecting the administration of law and justice (Part 6)
Includes bribery and corruption; contravention of statute; misleading justice; and escapes and rescues.

Crimes against morality and decency, sexual crimes, and public welfare (Part 7)
Includes crimes against religion; crimes against morality and decency; sexual crimes; sexual offences outside New Zealand; and crimes against public welfare.

Crimes against the person (Part 8)
Includes duties tending to the preservation of life; homicide; murder and manslaughter; abortion; assaults and injuries to the person; female genital mutilation; bigamy and feigned marriage; and abduction and kidnapping.

Crimes against rights of property (Part 10)

Threatening, conspiring, and attempting to commit offences (Part 11)

History
Prior to the 1880s, the colony of New Zealand  made few changes to the English criminal law adopted in 1840, aside from adopting the 1861 English reforms in 1867. One recommendation from the commissioners that consolidated the New Zealand statutes, prior to enactment of the Statutes Revision Act 1879 that allowed for their reprinting, was that the criminal law should be codified in a way that suited New Zealand conditions, rather than merely adopting similar legislative changes being debated in 1880 by the British Parliament. A Criminal Code bill was first drafted in 1883 and introduced into the House of Representatives in June that year. However, over the next 10 years the bill's passage through the Parliament failed to achieve majority support at various stages, despite repeated introductions and initial support. The bill was finally passed at the end of September 1893 and the Criminal Code Act 1893 received royal assent on 6 October 1893.

Enactment of the Consolidated Statutes Enactment Act 1908 on 4 August 1908 resulted in the Criminal Code Act 1893 being consolidated into the Crimes Act 1908. The 1908 act was further consolidated and amended with the passage of the Crimes Act 1961 on 1 November 1961.

Amendments
The Crimes Act has been substantially amended since 1961:

Punishment (Part 2)
Section 14 of the Crimes Act 1961 allowed death sentences. However, due to growing general public opposition to the death penalty, reformist New Zealand National Party Minister of Justice Ralph Hanan and other National MPs exercised a conscience vote and voted with the abolitionist New Zealand Labour Party to forbid judges passing sentence of death other than in cases of treason. That was the functional abolition in New Zealand, with no one executed after this date. In 1989, the death penalty was formally abolished by the Fourth Labour Government.

Matters of justification or excuse (Part 3)
The Crimes (Substituted Section 59) Amendment Act 2007 abolished Section 59 of the Crimes Act, which had previously allowed parental corporal punishment of children, despite opposition from religious social conservatives and others.

Crimes against morality and decency, sexual crimes, and public welfare (Part 7)
Amendments in 1985 resulted in crime of rape being replaced with one of sexual violation, a similar offence but without gender specificity. Further changes in 2005 resulted in gender specificity being removed from all criminal sexual offences.

The Crimes Amendment Act (No 3) 1985 (commenced 1 February 1986) criminalised marital rape and added the offence of sexual violation by unlawful sexual connection, criminalising female-on-male sexual violation and expanding sexual violation to include anal and oral intercourse.

The Homosexual Law Reform Act 1986 amended the Crimes Act, allowing for consensual homosexual relationships between men.

In 1995, the Crimes Amendment Act 1995 (No 49) inserted Sections 144A, 144B, and 144C which deal with sexual offenses outside of New Zealand. 
Section 144A of the Crimes Act deals with New Zealand citizens and ordinary residents that commit acts of child sexual abuse in overseas jurisdictions through child sex tourism. It applies existing prohibitions against sexual connection and indecent acts with children under twelve and young people to children within overseas jurisdictions. Under Section 144C, it is also illegal to promote child sex tourism overseas from New Zealand.

In 2003, the Prostitution Reform Act 2003 decriminalised sex work, removing sections 147-149A of the Crimes Act, which had formerly prohibited most forms of prostitution in New Zealand through maintaining criminal penalties against soliciting, living off the proceeds of sex work, brothel-keeping and managing sex workers.

In 2005, the Crimes Amendment Act 2005 (commenced 20 July 2005) amended the Crimes Act 1961 to make most sexual offences gender-neutral. This closed a legal loophole which prevented adult females from being convicted of sexual offending against boys under 16.

In March 2019, Parliament unanimously passed the Crimes Amendment Bill abolishing Section 123, which dealt with the offense of blasphemy, in accordance with modern religious pluralism and free speech sensibilities.

Crimes against the person (Part 8)
In 1987, Section 187A of the Crimes Act was inserted, permitting abortion on the grounds of saving the mother's life, mental health, and physical health; foetal abnormality within the 20 weeks gestation period; and incest or sexual intercourse with guardians and family members.

In January 1996, the Crimes Amendment Act 1995 inserted Section 20A, which outlaws female genital mutilation within New Zealand, and Section 204B, which deals with ancillary and related offences.

In 2002, the Sentencing Act 2002 changed the penalty for murder from mandatory life imprisonment to presumptive life imprisonment; sentencing judges now may waive the mandatory life imprisonment requirement and give a lesser sentence in exceptional ("manifestly unjust") circumstances.

In 2018, the Family Violence (Amendments) Act 2018 inserted new offenses relating to strangulation or suffocation (Section 189A), assault on person in a family relationship (Section 194A), coerced marriages or civil unions (Section 207A), and abductions for the purposes of marriage or civil union or sexual connection (Section 208).

In March 2020, the Abortion Legislation Act 2020 replaced Sections 182A to 187A with Section 183, which states that abortion is only an offense if a person who is not a health practitioner procures or performs an abortion on a woman. The woman is not guilty of the offense.

Euthanasia in New Zealand was formerly illegal under Sections 160 (culpable homicide), 173 (attempting to murder) and 179 (aiding and abetting suicide). Four attempts have been made to decriminalise assisted suicide through parliamentary bills in 1995, 2003, 2012, and 2019. In November 2019, David Seymour's End of Life Choice Bill passed its third reading. A binding referendum was held during the 2020 general election in September 2020 to pass the End of Life Choice Bill into law. Three quarters of voters supported reform, which will now take effect in early November 2021

Crimes against property (Part 10)
Part 10 of the act, Crimes against the right of property, was totally rewritten in 2003. In doing so, the definition of Burglary was revised and simplified to only require entry to be unauthorised rather than also requiring an act of breaking.

In 2019, the Crimes Amendment Act 2019 (No 4) introduced the concept of Burglary of agricultural land along with increasing penalties for Theft of animals, in response to increasing reports of stock rustling as well as nighttime hunting, slaughtering and butchering of farm animals in roadside fields.

See also
Abortion in New Zealand
Capital punishment in New Zealand
Euthanasia in New Zealand
Homosexual Law Reform Act 1986
Prostitution in New Zealand
Crime in New Zealand
Criminal Records (Clean Slate) Act 2004
List of Statutes of New Zealand

References

Further reading

External links

Statutes of New Zealand
Crime in New Zealand
1961 in New Zealand law
New Zealand